Kevin J. Gillespie (born December 16, 1977), is an American comic book creator and graphic artist. He is best known as the creator of Swearing In Front Of Children and for his independent company, Richmond Hill Comics. He was born in Richmond Hill, Queens, and currently lives and works in Queens, New York.

See also
List of best-selling comic series

References

1977 births
American comics artists
Living people
People from Richmond Hill, Queens
Artists from New York City
21st-century American male artists